Syneches debilis is a species of hybotid dance fly in the family Hybotidae.

References

Hybotidae
Articles created by Qbugbot
Insects described in 1895